Catchings is a surname. Notable people with the name include:

 Haney Catchings (1949–2015), American football coach
 Harvey Catchings (born 1951), American basketball player
 Tamika Catchings (born 1979), American basketball player
 Thomas C. Catchings (1847–1927), American politician, U.S. Representative from Mississippi
 Toney Catchings (born 1965), American football player
 Waddill Catchings (1879–1967), American economist

See also
 Dave Catching (born 1961), American musician
 David Catchings Dickson (1818–1880), American politician in Texas